Aerva lanata, the mountain knotgrass, is a woody, prostrate or succulent, perennial herb in the family Amaranthaceae, native to Asia, Africa. It has been included as occurring in Australia by the US government, but it is not recognised as occurring in Australia by any Australian state herbarium. The plant sometimes flowers in the first year.

Aerva lanata is a common weed which grows wild everywhere in the plains of India. The root has a camphor-like aroma. The dried flowers which look like soft spikes, are sold under the commercial names Buikallan and Boor. It is one of the plants included in Dasapushpam, the ten sacred flowers of Kerala.

Description

Mountain knotgrass is an annual with a branching, somewhat woody root system. They grow from whitish papery stipules with two lobes and red bases. The tiny clusters of two or three flowers grow in the leaf axils. The flowers are normally self-pollinated. Flowering time is from May to October.

Distribution and habitat

Aerva lanata is native to tropical Africa, South Africa, Madagascar, Saudi Arabia and tropical Asia. It is a common weed in arable fields and bare patches of ground.

Uses
This plant is used for food for people and animals. The whole plant, especially the leaves, is edible. The leaves are put into soup or eaten as a spinach or as a vegetable. The plant provides grazing for stock, game and chickens. The plant is used as a traditional medicine for snakebites. 

Though the plant has a lot of medicinal properties it’s quite commonly used in South India during the Tamil festival “Pongal” and Telugu harvest festival "Sankranti" as the flower of this plant is used for decoration. In Telugu language it's also called as "Pindi kommalu" and in Tamil language it’s also called as Ponga-Poo, which is derived from the names Pongal – A Harvest festival of Tamil Nadu and Poo in Tamil means Flower. Other common Tamil names used for this plant are "Kannu Pillai Poo" and "Siru Poolai".

The plant is also used as a talisman against evil spirits, a good-luck talisman for hunters, and a talisman for the well-being of widows.

In the traditional medicine of India, the juice of crushed Aerva lanata root is used for jaundice therapy.

References

External links

lanata
Afrotropical realm flora
Indomalayan realm flora
Flora of East Tropical Africa
Flora of Northeast Tropical Africa
Flora of South Tropical Africa
Flora of South Africa
Flora of West Tropical Africa
Flora of West-Central Tropical Africa
Flora of the Western Indian Ocean
Flora of the Arabian Peninsula
Flora of the Indian subcontinent
Flora of Malesia
Flora of Papua New Guinea
Flora of Queensland
Leaf vegetables
Plants used in traditional African medicine